Tyree Ridge is a narrow rock ridge that extends northeast for  from Mount Tyree in the Sentinel Range of the Ellsworth Mountains. It was named by the Advisory Committee on Antarctic Names in 2006, in association with Mount Tyree.

References

Ridges of Ellsworth Land
Ellsworth Mountains